To Have and to Hold is a 1951 British drama film directed by Godfrey Grayson and starring Avis Scott, Patrick Barr and Robert Ayres. Facing death following a riding accident, a man spends his final days arranging the future romantic needs of his wife.

Plot
Following a riding accident, country gentleman Brian Harding (Patrick Barr) is crippled and facing imminent death. His final days are spent arranging the future security of his wife and daughter (Avis Scott & Eunice Gayson). This extends to encouraging his wife to developing one of her male friendships into a romantic relationship.

Cast
 Avis Scott as June  
 Patrick Barr as Brian  
 Robert Ayres as Max  
 Harry Fine as Robert  
 Ellen Pollock as Roberta  
 Richard Warner as Cyril 
 Eunice Gayson as Peggy  
 Peter Neil as Dr. Pritchard

Critical reception
The Radio Times noted "A non-starry but well-played little drama, claustrophobic, certainly not uninteresting, but not quite good enough"; whereas Britmovie called it a "Stiff upper lip romantic melodrama, not quite so bad as it sounds."

References

Bibliography
 Hunter, Jack. House of horror: the complete Hammer Films story. Creation, 2000.

External links

1951 films
British drama films
1951 drama films
Films directed by Godfrey Grayson
Films set in England
British films based on plays
Hammer Film Productions films
British black-and-white films
1950s English-language films
1950s British films